City Gates is an album by the George Adams-Don Pullen Quartet recorded in 1983 for the Dutch Timeless label.

Reception
The Allmusic review by Steve Loewy awarded the album 4½ stars stating "By 1983, the quartet was at a musical peak, and this may be their best recording. Everything gels: The choice of tunes, the solos, and the arrangements all come together to produce one of the leading post-bop albums of the 1980s".

Track listing
All compositions by Don Pullen except as indicated
 "Mingus Metamorphosis" (George Adams) 13:20 
 "Samba For Now" – 8:31 
 "Thank You Very Much Mr. Monk" – 7:57 
 "Nobody Knows the Trouble I've Seen" (Traditional, arranged Adams, Pullen) – 5:18 
 "City Gates" (Adams) – 7:56 
Recorded in Munster, Holland on March 27 & 28, 1983

Personnel
Don Pullen – piano
George Adams – tenor saxophone, flute
Cameron Brown – bass
Dannie Richmond – drums

References

Timeless Records albums
Don Pullen albums
George Adams (musician) albums
1983 albums